Giuseppe Giurato was an Italian fencer, from Naples. He competed in the individual foil and épée events at the 1900 Summer Olympics.

References

External links
 

Year of birth missing
Year of death missing
Fencers from Naples
Italian male fencers
Olympic fencers of Italy
Fencers at the 1900 Summer Olympics
Place of death missing